The World Gravy Wrestling Championships is an annual event held in the village of Stacksteads, Lancashire. The first championship was held in 2007.

Bouts last two minutes, and participants wrestle a shallow pool filled with "Lancashire Gravy". The "Lancashire Gravy" was initially an actual gravy prepared with meat juices and vegetables. It was later replaced with a mixture of cornflour and caramel.

Bout winners are decided not only on their wrestling skills, but also whether the participant has a better fancy dress costume.

Money raised by the Championship is donated to local charitable organisations.

Video clips from the 2010 event was featured on Australian TV show The Footy Show (AFL) in 2017 - Season 24, Episode 4 - as part of the Sam's Mailbag feature followed by a brief discussion about Aussie Rules ex-player panelists that should feature in it.

Gravy wrestling championship results were included in the Guinness World Records in 2019.

See also
 World Black Pudding Throwing Championships

References

2007 establishments in England
Culture in Lancashire
Annual events in England